One Wonderful Night is a lost  1914 American silent mystery drama film starring Francis X. Bushman and Beverly Bayne, at the time a romantic screen couple. It was produced by the Chicago-based Essanay Studios.

The same story was later filmed in 1922 at Universal with Herbert Rawlinson.

Cast
Francis X. Bushman as John Delancey Curtis
Beverly Bayne as Lady Hermione
John Cossar as Horace P. Curtis
Helen Dunbar as Mrs. Horace P. Curtis
Lillian Drew as Marcelle
Howard Watrous as Henry R. Hunter
Thomas Commerford as The Earl of Vallefort
Rapley Holmes as Count Vassilan
Leo White as Jean de Curtois
E. J. Babille as Antonie Lamotte  (credited as Edward Babille)
Charles Hitchcock as Gregory Martiny

See also
Francis X. Bushman filmography

References

External links

allmovie/Synopsis
Sheet music covers for the film

1914 films
Lost American films
Essanay Studios films
Films based on British novels
1914 drama films
American mystery drama films
American black-and-white films
American silent feature films
1910s mystery drama films
Lost drama films
1914 lost films
Lost mystery drama films
Films directed by E. H. Calvert
1910s American films
Silent American drama films
Silent mystery drama films
1910s English-language films